Gostiny Dvor – is a shopping (merchant) center in the historical center of Kamensk-Uralsky, Sverdlovsk oblast.

The building was granted the status of regional significance in the 31st of December 1987 (decision № 535 by the executive committee of Sverdlovsk oblast Council of People's Deputies). The object number of cultural heritage of regional significance is 661720983680005.

Architecture 
The Gostiny Dvor was built in the period from 1820-1840s and was reconstructed at the end of the 19th century. It was included in the general plan of the town in 1848. It has a rectangular form building with an open center. Structurally the building is divided into two parts: the northern part which overlooking the Cathedral Square, and the southern part - overlooking Lenin Street (former Bolshaya Moskovskaya Street). The Gostiny Dvor forms the southeast corner of the Cathedral Square. It refers to the historical shopping facilities of the Urals at the end of the 19th century.

The main entrance of the building is inside the courtyard. The entire construction is focused on a voluminous composition. The partitions divide the inner space into the rows of the cell rooms. The original interior decor was lost. The authors of the project are not known.

References

Literature 
 
 Памятники архитектуры Каменска-Уральского / С. И. Гаврилова, Л. В. Зенкова, А. В. Кузнецова, А. Ю. Лесунова — Екатеринбург: Банк культурной информации, 2008. — 92 с.

Tourist attractions in Sverdlovsk Oblast
Buildings and structures in Kamensk-Uralsky
Cultural heritage monuments in Kamensk-Uralsky
Cultural heritage monuments of regional significance in Sverdlovsk Oblast